Tettey is a Ghanaian masculine given name. Notable people with the name include:

 Emmanuel Tettey Mensah (1919–1996), Ghanaian musician
 Mustapha Tettey Addy (born 1942), Ghanaian drummer and ethnomusicologist

African masculine given names